The 2019 Tallahassee Tennis Challenger was a professional tennis tournament played on green clay courts. It was the 20th edition of the tournament and was part of the 2019 ATP Challenger Tour. It took place in Tallahassee, Florida, United States between 22 and 28 April 2019.

Singles main-draw entrants

Seeds

 1 Rankings as of April 15, 2019.

Other entrants
The following players received wildcards into the singles main draw:
  Sekou Bangoura
  Zane Khan
  Sebastian Korda
  Dennis Novikov
  Alexander Ritschard

The following players received entry into the singles main draw using their ITF World Tennis Ranking:
  Sandro Ehrat
  Aslan Karatsev
  Arthur Rinderknech
  Alejandro Tabilo
  Alexander Zhurbin

The following players received entry from the qualifying draw:
  Jordi Arconada
  Benjamin Hassan

The following player received entry as a lucky loser:
  Johannes Härteis

Champions

Singles

 Emilio Gómez def.  Tommy Paul 6–2, 6–2.

Doubles

 Roberto Maytín /  Fernando Romboli def.  Thai-Son Kwiatkowski /  Noah Rubin 6–2, 4–6, [10–7].

References

External links
Official Website

2019 ATP Challenger Tour
2019
2019 in American tennis
2019 in sports in Florida
April 2019 sports events in the United States